Komarna is a village in southern Dalmatia, Croatia, in the municipality of Slivno; population 167 (2011). It is located near the larger village of Klek.

The village is south of the Neretva Delta, 70 km north of Dubrovnik on the coast of Mali Ston Bay, overlooking the Pelješac peninsula, near the Pelješac Bridge.

References

External links

Komarna is located in Mali Ston Bay overlooking Pelješac peninsula and small islands.

Populated places in Dubrovnik-Neretva County